The canton of Villeneuve-sur-Yonne is a canton of France, located in the Yonne département, in the Bourgogne-Franche-Comté région. It has 12 communes.

Communes
Since the French canton reorganisation which came into effect in March 2015, the communes of the canton of Villeneuve-sur-Yonne are:

 Armeau
 Les Bordes
 Bussy-le-Repos
 Chaumot
 Dixmont
 Étigny
 Marsangy
 Passy
 Piffonds
 Rousson 
 Véron
 Villeneuve-sur-Yonne

See also 
 Cantons of the Yonne department

References

External links
Associations of the canton 

 seatneuve-sur-Yonne